Oz Raly (born 22 December 1987) is an Israeli footballer who currently plays for F.C. Holon Yermiyahu.

Club career 
On 11 June 2012, Raly signed a contract with AC Omonia but he was released from the club before the season started and returned to Bnei Yehuda.

References

1987 births
Living people
Israeli footballers
Bnei Yehuda Tel Aviv F.C. players
Maccabi Tel Aviv F.C. players
Hapoel Ironi Kiryat Shmona F.C. players
Beitar Jerusalem F.C. players
Hapoel Ashkelon F.C. players
Hapoel Umm al-Fahm F.C. players
Hapoel Ashdod F.C. players
F.C. Holon Yermiyahu players
Shimshon Kafr Qasim F.C. players
Footballers from Bat Yam
Israeli Premier League players
Liga Leumit players
Association football defenders
Association football midfielders